The canton of Sainte-Fortunade is an administrative division of the Corrèze department, south-central France. It was created at the French canton reorganisation which came into effect in March 2015. Its seat is in Sainte-Fortunade.

It consists of the following communes:
 
Champagnac-la-Prune
Chanac-les-Mines
Le Chastang
Clergoux
Cornil
Espagnac
Eyrein
Gros-Chastang
Gumond
Ladignac-sur-Rondelles
Lagarde-Marc-la-Tour
Laguenne-sur-Avalouze
Pandrignes
La Roche-Canillac
Sainte-Fortunade
Saint-Martial-de-Gimel
Saint-Martin-la-Méanne
Saint-Pardoux-la-Croisille
Saint-Paul
Saint-Priest-de-Gimel

References

Cantons of Corrèze